Biron is a commune in the Dordogne department in southwestern France.

Geography
Biron lies between the Dropt and Lède rivers between the towns of Monpazier, Villeréal and Villefranche-du-Périgord.

Population

Sights
Biron is dominated by the Château de Biron, which overlooks the village and was a bastion in medieval times. Today the château is a tourist hotspot in the summer months.

See also
Communes of the Dordogne département

References

External links

 Town council webpage

Communes of Dordogne
Dukes of Biron